Ángel Lulio Cabrera (born 19 October 1908 in Madrid, Spain – died 8 July 1999 in Buenos Aires, Argentina) was an Argentinian botanist.

Biography 
Born in Madrid, Cabrera was the son of zoologist and paleontologist Ángel Cabrera and nephew of the first Anglican bishop in Spain, Juan Bautista Cabrera. His vocation in biology was influenced by family vacations in the Sierra de Guadarrama, as well as his father's profession.

Abbreviation

See also
Taxa named by Ángel Lulio Cabrera

References

1908 births
1999 deaths
Scientists from Madrid
20th-century Argentine botanists